The Batanes Provincial Board is the Sangguniang Panlalawigan (provincial legislature) of the Philippine province of Batanes.

The members are elected via plurality-at-large voting: the province is divided into two districts, each sending three members to the provincial board; the electorate votes for three members, with the three candidates with the highest number of votes being elected. The vice governor is the ex officio presiding officer, and only votes to break ties. The vice governor is elected via the plurality voting system province-wide.

District apportionment

List of members
An additional three ex officio members are the presidents of the provincial chapters of the Association of Barangay Captains, the Councilors' League, the Sangguniang Kabataan
provincial president; the municipal and city (if applicable) presidents of the Association of Barangay Captains, Councilor's League and Sangguniang Kabataan, shall elect amongst themselves their provincial presidents which shall be their representatives at the board.

Current members 
These are the members after the 2019 local elections and 2018 barangay and SK elections:

 Vice Governor: Ignacio Villa (Liberal)

Past members

Vice Governor

1st District

 Municipalities: Basco, Mahatao
 Population (2020): 11,220

2nd District

 Municipalities: Itbayat, Ivana, Sabtang, Uyugan
 Population (2020): 7,611

References

Provincial boards in the Philippines
Politics of Batanes